The 1952 Los Angeles Rams season was the team's 15th year with the National Football League and the seventh season in Los Angeles.

Schedule

Playoffs

Standings

References

Los Angeles Rams
Los Angeles Rams seasons
Los Angeles